Patrick Henry Maxwell FMedSci is a British physician and the Regius Professor of Physic at the University of Cambridge, a position he has held since 2012. His research focuses regulation of gene expression by changes in oxygen. Patrick studied for a DPhil in Medicine at Corpus Christi College, Oxford. He undertook postgraduate clinical and research training in nephrology and general medicine at Guy's Hospital and in Oxford.

References

20th-century British medical doctors
21st-century British medical doctors
Living people
Fellows of the Academy of Medical Sciences (United Kingdom)
Fellows of Trinity College, Cambridge
Regius Professors of Physic (Cambridge)
Year of birth missing (living people)
NIHR Senior Investigators